The Central Washington–Western Washington football rivalry, also known as the Cascade Cup, and the Battle in Seattle, was an annual football game between Central Washington University and Western Washington University. The two teams first met in 1922 and Central leads the series. The rivalry has been compared to the larger Apple Cup rivalry between the Washington Huskies and the Washington State Cougars, which also includes schools based on the western and eastern site of the state.

The rivalry became a historic rivalry when Western Washington cut its football program in January 2009.

Game results

Source:

See also  
 List of NCAA college football rivalry games

References 

College football rivalries in the United States
Central Washington Wildcats football
Western Washington Vikings football
Recurring sporting events established in 1922
1922 establishments in Washington (state)
2008 disestablishments in Washington (state)
Recurring sporting events disestablished in 2008